"U Send Me Swingin'" is a song performed by Mint Condition, issued as the second single from their second album From the Mint Factory. The song was produced by the band and written by the band's then-keyboardist Keri Lewis. Released in 1993, the song peaked at #33 on the Billboard Hot 100 in 1994.

Charts

Weekly charts

Year-end charts

References

1993 singles
Mint Condition (band) songs
Perspective Records singles
1993 songs
Contemporary R&B ballads
1990s ballads